Euphaedra niveovittata is a butterfly in the family Nymphalidae. It is found in the southern part of the Democratic Republic of the Congo.

References

Butterflies described in 1955
niveovittata
Endemic fauna of the Democratic Republic of the Congo
Butterflies of Africa